Rumā was the wife of Sugrīva. She is mentioned in Book IV (Kishkindha Kanda) of Ramayana. Ruma and Sugriva fell in love with each other and wanted to marry each other. But Ruma's father did not approve. Hence, Sugriva with the help of  Hanuman, abducted Ruma and they married each other. Ruma was taken away from Sugriva by Vāli following the strife of two royal Vānara brothers. Later, the fact of Rumā being withheld by Vāli became the primary justification of Rama's slaying Vāli and helping Sugrīva to become the sovereign of Kishkindha. When accused by Vāli of lowly, treacherous and unexpected assassination from the shades by Rama's arrow, Rāma says his assassination was a just punishment for the sin Vāli committed when he robbed Sugrīva of Rumā, his wedded spouse, and used her for his own pleasure.

References 

Vanara in the Ramayana
Characters in the Ramayana